This is a list of magistrates of Pingtung County. The incumbent Magistrate is Chou Chun-mi of the Democratic Progressive Party since 25 December 2022.

Directly elected county magistrates

Timeline

References

See also
 Pingtung County

Pingtung County